This article lists military officers who have served as the commanders of the Pattimura Military Region from its formation in 1957 until now.

References

Indonesian military personnel